Ane Eidem (born 21 January 1993 in Elnesvågen) is a Norwegian handballer who plays for Ringkøbing Håndbold.

She is a twin sister of Vilde Eidem who played for HK Halden.

References

1993 births
Living people
People from Fræna
Norwegian female handball players
Expatriate handball players
Norwegian expatriate sportspeople in Romania
Twin sportspeople
Sportspeople from Møre og Romsdal